The Builders Exchange Building, at 202-208 N. Main St. in Santa Ana, California, was built in 1929.  It was listed on the National Register of Historic Places in 1982.

It was designed by architect William Rohrbacher in simplified Beaux Arts style.
The building is currently owned by California-based General Contractor Swinerton Builders, CSLB 0092.

References

National Register of Historic Places in Orange County, California
Beaux-Arts architecture in California
Buildings and structures completed in 1929